This article comprises three sortable tables of the major mountain peaks of Virginia. This article defines a significant summit as a summit with at least  of topographic prominence, and a major summit as a summit with at least  of topographic prominence. All summits in this article have at least 500 meters of topographic prominence.  An ultra-prominent summit is a summit with at least  of topographic prominence.

The summit of a mountain or hill may be measured in three principal ways:
The topographic elevation of a summit measures the height of the summit above a geodetic sea level. The first table below ranks the major summits of Virginia by elevation.
The topographic prominence of a summit is a measure of how high the summit rises above its surroundings. The second table below ranks the 50 most prominent summits of Virginia.
The topographic isolation (or radius of dominance) of a summit measures how far the summit lies from its nearest point of equal elevation. The third table below ranks the 11 most isolated major summits of Virginia.



Highest major summits

Of these 11 peaks, 3 are located in Tazewell County, 2 in Giles County, and the 6 other mountains lie on 8 different counties.

Most prominent summits

Most isolated major summits

Notes

References

Mountains
Virginia